Antonio Debenedetti (12 June 1937 – 3 October 2021) was an Italian writer.

Biography

Works
Rifiuto di obbedienza (1958)
Monsieur Kitsch (1972)
Se la vita non è vita (1976)
Maman (1976)
In assenza del signor Plot (1976)
Ancora un bacio (1981)
Spavaldi e strambi (1987)
Racconti naturali e straordinari (1993)
Giacomino (1994)
Amarsi male. Undici sentimenti brevi (1998)
Un giovedì dopo le cinque (2000)
E fu settembre (2005)
Un piccolo grande Novecento. Conversazione con Paolo Di Paolo (2005)
In due (2008)
L' ultimo dandy (2009)
Quasi un racconto (2009)
E nessuno si accorse che mancava una stella (2010)
Dal Piacere alla Dolce Vita. Roma 1889-1960, una capitale allo specchio (2010)
Il tempo degli angeli e degli assassini (2011)

Honors
Order of Merit of the Italian Republic (2004)

References

1937 births
2021 deaths
Italian writers
Writers from Turin
Recipients of the Order of Merit of the Italian Republic